Taşkınköy is a quarter of North Nicosia in Northern Cyprus. As of 2011, it had a population of 3,847.

The first settlement in the area was after the 1974 conflict, as houses were built by a labor union, Türk-Sen. The area was named "Taşkınköy" after Necati Taşkın, the chairman of the labor union who was killed in a crash while the construction was still underway.

Today, the area hosts a vibrant shopping street, with occasional shopping festivals.

References 

North Nicosia
Suburbs of Nicosia